Universal Transportes Aéreos was a Brazilian airline founded in 1947. In December 1948 it ceased operations.

History 
Universal was founded in the end of 1947 and operated flights between Rio de Janeiro and locations in Minas Gerais. Later it added São Paulo to the network. On December 1, 1948 it ceased operations.

Destinations 
Universal served the following cities:
Belo Horizonte – Pampulha Airport
Lavras
Rio de Janeiro – Santos Dumont Airport
São Lourenço – São Lourenço Airport
São Paulo – Congonhas Airport

Fleet

See also 

List of defunct airlines of Brazil

References

External links 

Defunct airlines of Brazil
Airlines established in 1947
Airlines disestablished in 1948
1947 establishments in Brazil